The Sydney SuperDome (currently known as the Qudos Bank Arena) is a large multipurpose arena located in Sydney, Australia.  It is situated in Sydney Olympic Park, and was completed in 1999 as part of the facilities for the 2000 Summer Olympics.

The A$190million facility was designed by COX Architecture & Devine deFlon Yaeger, and constructed by Abigroup and Obayashi Corporation Bob Carr, premier of New South Wales, officially opened the stadium in November 1999.

The development of the stadium was part of three subsites which also included a 3,400-space carpark which cost A$25 million, and a plaza with external works, also costing $25 million.

The arena is ranked in the top 10 arenas worldwide. It is currently managed by AEG Ogden. For three consecutive years the venue was a finalist for the Billboard Touring Awards in the top venue category.

The arena has a total capacity of 21,032 with a seating capacity of around 18,200 making the SuperDome the largest permanent indoor sports and entertainment venue in Australia.

Stadium name history
The arena was known as the Sydney SuperDome from opening in 1999 until 11 May 2006 when it was renamed Acer Arena (after Acer Inc.) as part of a naming rights deal. The naming rights were subsequently purchased by Allphones, the new name Allphones Arena taking effect from 1 September 2011. Since 11 April 2016, the venue has been known as Qantas Credit Union Arena then Qudos Bank Arena (after the rebranded Qudos Bank).

Design

The Sydney SuperDome is designed at an average capacity of 18,200 seated, with a maximum possible capacity of 21,032, according to the Sydney Olympic Park Authority. The SuperDome's bowl is rearrangeable in various modes to accommodate for sports events, concerts, and the like, and the venue's capacity fluctuates depending on the event hosted. The venue is created from 5,696m3 of concrete, 1,884 tonnes of reinforcing steel, and is topped with a 1,235 tonne roof structure. 18 steel masts suspend from the zinc and aluminium-composed and alloy-coated steel roof, which is tensioned by cables stretching from the top of each mast to the center of the roof. The interior ceiling of the venue is decorated in a corrugated steel profile, heavily insulated with materials such as numerous copies of unused Yellow pages telephone directories.

Various measures were made at the request of the Sydney Organising Committee for the Olympic Games (SOCOG) for environmentally friendly design measures. In its early years, the Sydney SuperDome used renewable energy for a fraction of its power supply, provided by EnergyAustralia's green power scheme. The venue saw use of green power through a deal with EnergyAustralia that lasted the duration of the 2000 Summer Olympics and the five years following. The SuperDome's power architecture includes 1,176 photovoltaic solar panels, installed on the arena's roof, which provide 10% of the venue's daily energy consumption, estimated at ~8612MWh annually. Energy efficient lighting and heating/cooling systems were also installed in the venue. The roof's drainage system consists over 2000m of high-density polyethylene pipes, in addition to nearly 3000m of cast iron and copper pipes used in the venue's plumbing system, and 1000m of vitrified clay pipes that make up the SuperDome's surrounding stormwater drainage system. The SuperDome was also one of many venues built at Sydney Olympic Park that made use of recycled timber, used to construct the exterior balconies of the venue. The timber was sourced from Kempsey, and Oberon, along with local sources in Sydney. Additionally, polypropylene seats with nylon arms and mountings make up the SuperDome's stands.

Events

The arena is home to many major entertainment and conference events and is a venue of choice for major entertainment promoters.

Regular or annual events
 Hillsong Conference (2001–2010, 2012–2019)
 ARIA Music Awards (2002–2009, 2011)
Sydney Kings Home Venue (1999–2002, 2016–present)
NSW Schools Spectacular (2016–present)
Intel Extreme Masters Sydney (2017–2019)

Notable occasional events
On 11 December 1999, a league record 17,803 spectators attended a NBL match between the Sydney Kings and West Sydney Razorbacks. The record has since been eclipsed twice by Kings games at the Superdome. On 10 March 2023 18,049 fans watched the Sydney Kings defeat the New Zealand Breakers in Game 3 of the 2023 NBL Grand Final series. Just five days later the current record of 18,124 attended the deciding Game 5 of the series where the Kings defeated the Breakers to win the Championship.

During the 2000 Olympic Games, the venue hosted the men's and women's basketball finals, and the artistic and trampoline gymnastics events. In the men's basketball, the Bronze medal playoff won by Lithuania 89-71 over host nation Australia, and the Gold Medal playoff, won by the United States 85-75 over France, drew 14,833 fans to the arena. The permanent seating capacity of the SuperDome was reduced to approximately 15,500 during the Olympics due to the usual large number of seats allocated for the media.

In 2001 the SuperDome was the host of the ATP World Tour Finals Tennis Masters Cup won by Australian World number one men's tennis player Lleyton Hewitt, defeating Frenchman Sébastien Grosjean in the Final 6–3, 6–3, 6–4.

On 13 November 2004, the SuperDome attracted the record attendance for a netball game in Australia when 14,339 turned out to see the Australian Netball Diamonds defeat the New Zealand Silver Ferns, 54–49.

On 28 July 2008, an ANZ Championship-record 12,999 fans saw the New South Wales Swifts defeat the Waikato Bay of Plenty Magic, 65–56, in the ANZ Championship Grand Final at the Acer Arena.

On 3 July 2009, Taiwanese pop singer Jay Chou came to Sydney to perform a one-off concert. It became the number one box office record holder for Allphones Arena, and has stayed in this position ever since. In that concert he broke 11 records in Australia including largest audience (15,200), highest total sponsored amount and highest production cost ($480 000). The box office reached US$2.6 million, out-grossing Beyoncé and The Eagles placing him at rank 2 worldwide.

On 17 November 2014, Narendra Modi, Prime Minister of India, addressed Indians residing in Australia.

Matches of the 2015 Netball World Cup were held at Allphones Arena, and the world record for a netball match was broken three times. Day 3 of the World Cup attracted 16,233 spectators. Day 9 attracted 16,244 while the Final held on 16 August 2015 attracted a netball world record attendance of 16,752 to see Australia defeat New Zealand 58–55 to win their third straight INF Netball World Cup and their 11th overall.

In November–December 2014, American singer-songwriter Katy Perry performed at the arena as part of The Prismatic World Tour, breaking the Allphones Arena ticket record with 89,500 patrons over six shows.

In 2021, it was announced that as a result of the COVID-19 pandemic, the arena would be used as a COVID-19 mass vaccination hub, commencing on 9 August 2021.

Sports teams
The venue is the former home of Suncorp Super Netball clubs Giants Netball and the New South Wales Swifts, both of whom have played finals and high-profile matches at the arena. Australian National Basketball League club the Sydney Kings also play their home matches at the arena. Due to the COVID–19 pandemic, On 28 May 2021, Melbourne United announced they would play a home game at the Arena against the Cairns Taipans. Originally to be played at John Cain Arena, then Cairns Pop-Up Arena, the game commenced with no audience three days later.

Gallery

See also

 2000 Summer Olympics venues
 List of sports venues in Australia
 List of indoor arenas in Australia
 List of National Basketball League (Australia) venues
 List of Suncorp Super Netball venues
COVID-19 pandemic in New South Wales
 WWE Australian Live Shows.

References

External links

 
 

Event venues established in 1999
1999 establishments in Australia
Sports venues completed in 1999
Sports venues in Sydney
Music venues in Sydney
Indoor arenas in Australia
Venues of the 2000 Summer Olympics
Olympic basketball venues
Olympic gymnastics venues
Netball venues in New South Wales
Basketball venues in Australia
National Basketball League (Australia) venues
Boxing venues in Australia
Sydney Kings
New South Wales Swifts
Giants Netball
Sydney Swifts
Philip Cox buildings
Sydney Olympic Park